A Kullu shawl is a type of shawl made in Kullu, India, featuring various geometrical patterns and bright colors. Originally, indigenous Kullvi people would weave plain shawls, but following the arrival of craftspeople from Bushahr in the early 1940s, the trend of more patterned shawls came to rise.

Kullu Shawls are well known all around the world for its simple and elegant designs and its fine woolen fabric and manufacturing quality. Kullu shawls are worn by both: men and women, but men's shawls are usually called "Loi" or "Pattu" and are often plain without any pattern or minimal patterned stripes on two edges.

Typical Kullu shawls have geometrical designs on both ends. The shawls may also have floral designs, which may run all over. Each design may have up to eight colors. Most traditional colors are often bright colors, used to emphasize the shawl and make it more appealing, however, there are instances where the shawl is made with a more dull color, such as pastel. Kulu shawls are also crafted in yak's wool, sheep wool, Pashmina, and other handcrafted material.

History
Prior to national independence, modern and industrialized clothing products did not reach much of the rural parts of the nation. The region in which the Kullvi people inhabit is a temperate region in the Himalayan region, providing an abundance of Sheep, Ox, and various other furred organisms. Prior to the arrival of more modern craftsmen, the primary attire was Patti woven to protect against the harsh cold typical of the region. Following the arrival of a craftsman from Himachal Pradesh, the Kullu Shawl became prominent following the introduction of artistic patterns and floral art, it became a significant article of clothing for most inhabitants of the Himalayan area.

Characteristics:

Kullu shawls are mostly made of three types of wool: Merino wool, Angora wool and Local sheep wool. These different kinds of wools are sometimes used combined to make more varieties. Designs patterns are mostly geometric shapes with few exceptions where floral designs are used.

Prices:

Cost of these shawls can vary significantly depending on its design and other factors. Despite its expensive cost hand woven shawls are very popular with its admirers because of its organic nature(handmade), beautiful, elegant design and its warm woolen fabric.

Prices of Kullu shawls depend on these factors: design patterns, the amount of those patterns in shawls, the wool type and the quality of the fabric made of those wools. Prices can range between Rs. 800/- to Rs 10,000/-. Higher cost shawls are also available in the market but they are often difficult to find.

Importance of Kullu Shawls in the local economy:

Kullu shawls play a very significant role in the economy of the valley. It is one of the major income sources for these people where thousands of them earn their living by weaving part time or full time. Around 20,000 people work part-time and about 10,000 people earn their livelihood by working full-time. These shawls are made in the valley itself by local people who have inherited their skills from their past generations. Shawls made in the valley are woven using handlooms and these handlooms can be found in almost every home in rural areas. These are used to weave shawls and fabric for other clothes to fulfill their own needs or for commercial purposes. Kullu shawls are also an important part of the heritage of Himachal Pradesh due to which state government provides many benefits to weavers so this heritage can flourish and can be preserved.
The current state of Kullu Shawls:

Kullu shawls are made using handlooms but these days some outside manufacturers especially from Ludhiana, (http://archive.indianexpress.com/news/80--kullu-shawls-have--made-in-ludhiana--stamp/717485/) are producing cheap factory-made material with copied design patterns and selling it on heavy discounts which is leaving a very bad impact on original Kullu Shawls' market share and valley's economy. Consequently, it is discouraging weavers who have been working on this craft for decades making this beautiful art die a slow death. Handmade kullu shawls are getting a very tough competition because of its relatively higher cost as it involves a lot of hard work.

State government has recently taken many steps to prevent these crises. Most crucial of them all is assigning of Geographic Indicator (GI) to Kullu Shawls (http://hpscste.nic.in/pbulletin/third.html). This GI can only be used to those shawls which have being produced in the valley itself and have been made using the handlooms. This practice has been adopted to restrict the sale of power-loom-made shawls in the name Kullu Shawls.
How to make sure whether it is original or fake?

Follow these tips to ensure you do not end up buying fake, factory-made shawls:

 Don't fall for big discounts. Handmade shawls are often very genuinely priced so discounts are not affordable. So if you're getting heavy discounts, chances are you are not getting real thing.
 Avoid referrals from Taxi drivers. They often get big commissions to refer tourists to buy factory made shawls/stoles. Rather ask some local person or shopkeeper.
 Most of the original kullu shaw ls vendors are a part of some registered society so you can ask shopkeepers about it and if they are registered under one then it is safe to buy from them. List of few well known societies is provided below in next section.
 Government has issued a Geographic Indicator(GI) to original Kullu Shawls. So you can ask shopkeeper about it, but it is not very common and very few societies have obtained it so it is not an idle way to confirm the authenticity of Kullu Shawls.

References

HimalayanKraft

External links
Kullu Shawls, Himachal Pradesh. 

 
History of Asian clothing
Geographical indications in Himachal Pradesh